Dibromoiodoethylene is a dense organic liquid consisting of an ethylene core with  two bromine atoms and one iodine atom as substituents. It is formed by the reaction of dibromoacetylene with hydrogen iodide.

There are three isomers of dibromoiodoethylene, varying in the position of the two bromine atoms compared to each other.

References

Organobromides
Organoiodides